"Go Loko" is a song by American rapper YG featuring fellow American rapper Tyga and Puerto Rican rapper Jon Z. It was released as the second single from YG's album 4Real 4Real on May 3, 2019. The music video was released alongside the song. It debuted at number 71 on the US Billboard Hot 100 before peaking at number 49.

Live performances
The artists performed the song on Jimmy Kimmel Live! on May 6.  The three also performed the song on The Ellen DeGeneres Show on May 23, with accompaniment from a mariachi band.  The latter show did not censor any Spanish profanities in Jon Z's verse during its initial broadcast, despite the English profanities being sufficiently censored. This resulted in The Ellen DeGeneres Show removing the performance video from their website 24 hours later.

Charts

Weekly charts

Year-end charts

Certifications

References

2019 singles
2019 songs
YG (rapper) songs
Tyga songs
Jon Z songs
Song recordings produced by Mustard (record producer)
Songs written by Mustard (record producer)
Songs written by Tyga
Songs written by YG (rapper)
Def Jam Recordings singles